940 Kordula (prov. designation:  or ) is a large and dark Cybele asteroid from the outermost region of the asteroid belt, approximately  in diameter. It was discovered on 10 October 1920, by astronomer Karl Reinmuth at the Heidelberg-Königstuhl State Observatory in Germany. The carbonaceous F-type asteroid (FC) has a rotation period of 15.6 hours. It was named "Kordula", a common German female name unrelated to the discoverer's contemporaries, that was taken from the almanac Lahrer Hinkender Bote.

Orbit and classification 

Kordula is a non-family asteroid of the main belt's background population when applying the hierarchical clustering method to its proper orbital elements. It is located in the orbital region of the dynamical Cybele asteroids, which stay in a 7:4 orbital resonance with Jupiter. The Cybeles are the last outpost of the extended asteroid belt, already located beyond the Hecuba gap. It orbits the Sun in the outermost asteroid belt at a distance of 2.8–3.9 AU once every 6 years and 2 months (2,255 days; semi-major axis of 3.37 AU). Its orbit has an eccentricity of 0.17 and an inclination of 6° with respect to the ecliptic. The body's observation arc begins at Heidelberg Observatory on 11 October 1920, the night after its official discovery observation.

Naming 

This minor planet was named "Kordula", after a female name picked from the Lahrer Hinkender Bote, published in Lahr, southern Germany. A Hinkender Bote (lit. "limping messenger") was a very popular almanac, especially in the alemannic-speaking region from the late 17th throughout the early 20th century. The calendar section contains feast days, the dates of important fairs and astronomical ephemerides. The calendar contains a German name day analogue for the respective catholic and protestant feast-days (entry not found). "Kordula" derives from Cordula and may refer to Saint Cordula.

Reinmuth's calendar names 

As with 22 other asteroids – starting with 913 Otila, and ending with 1144 Oda – Reinmuth selected names from this calendar due to his many asteroid discoveries that he had trouble thinking of proper names. These names are not related to the discoverer's contemporaries. Lutz Schmadel, the author of the Dictionary of Minor Planet Names learned about Reinmuth's source of inspiration from private communications with Dutch astronomer Ingrid van Houten-Groeneveld, who worked as a young astronomer at Heidelberg.

Physical characteristics 

In the Tholen classification, Kordula is closest to an F-type asteroid, and somewhat similar to that to a common carbonaceous C-type asteroid.

Rotation period 

In October 1999, a rotational lightcurve of Kordula was obtained from photometric observations by Vincenzo Zappalà and his Italian colleagues. Lightcurve analysis gave a well-defined rotation period of  hours with a brightness amplitude of  magnitude.

Diameter and albedo 

The Collaborative Asteroid Lightcurve Link adopts the results from IRAS, that is, an albedo of 0.0352 and a diameter of 87.21 km based on an absolute magnitude of 9.55.

References

External links 
 Lightcurve Database Query (LCDB), at www.minorplanet.info
 Dictionary of Minor Planet Names, Google books
 Discovery Circumstances: Numbered Minor Planets (1)-(5000) – Minor Planet Center
 
 

000940
Discoveries by Karl Wilhelm Reinmuth
Named minor planets
000940
19201010